Governor Barnes may refer to:

Cassius McDonald Barnes (1845–1925), 4th Governor of Oklahoma Territory
Edward Barnes (British Army officer) (1776–1838), Governor of Ceylon from 1820 to 1822 (Acting) and from 1824 to 1831
Roy Barnes (born 1948), 80th Governor of Georgia